Sanabes is one of the villages in Tarut Island, the second biggest island that is located on the east coast Saudi Arabia in the Persian Gulf. Sanabes extends on Tarut beach for about four kilometers which starts from what used to be called the Elementary School of Ammar ibn Yasir and now Middle school of Sanabes until Al-Saffar Farm, bounded by Al Rabai’yah southwest and by Tarut village to the west, Al-Zoor to the north and Darain to the south.
The location has two advantages: The fertile soil and excellent fishing places. There is also a village called Sanabes in neighbouring Bahrain, a few miles from the capital, Manama. Like the Saudi Sanabes, the Bahraini village of Sanabes is also populated by Shi'a Muslims.

Population
Population is currently estimated at 7,000. Sanabes people in the past used to work in fishing and the extraction of Pearl hunting(Diving). It was one port in the Persian Gulf region where the sailors and fishermen ships settles on its coast. The number of fishing boats was about 140 boats. As a result, Sanabes represent an important place among sailors and pearl merchants. However, Sanabes fishers now are using Zour or Dareen jetty.

History
Sanabes contains many archaeological stuff from the Ottoman; old Islamic ; and Portuguese Covenants; unfortunately, all of them destroyed, nothing in Sanabes - except only districts : the northern sector, and the southern district, and nearly for the four decades they expended to be dependably new ones ((City workers residential)) resulted in ((Al Saffar farm residential)) to the south of Sanabes in the eighties, in extended housing in the past few years westerly direction with the accomplishment of Al-Noor sports club center and planning the land surrounding it.

Some famous landmarks in Sanabes:
Ayn Um Al Fursan (Water Spring): One of the well known springs in Sanabes.
Alwazarah: Grove of the Grapevines and Palm trees, a popular place to walk and promenade
Sheikh Mohammed Al Mubarak Mosque: It is one of the oldest and largest mosques in Sanabes.

Religion
People who live in Tarut Island and the province of Qatif, the majority of them are Muslims.

Alnoor Club
Alnoor club :ar:نادي النور was founded in 1961 as Sanabis's own Sports Club. The clubs hosts a variety of sports, including Soccer, Handball, Boxing, Basketball, Volleyball, Table Tennis, Fencing and athletics. Alnoor is known to have been a home for many of Saudi Arabia's most excellent athletes. The club's handball players are considered some of best in the Kingdom; having won many local and international championships in the past. Notably, The Premium Saudi Championship, Gulf Clubs Championship and the Arab Championship for Handball Clubs. Although Alnoor traditionally has given particular emphasis on Handball, it celebrated many achievements in other sports, too.

Sanabes Social Committee
Sanabes has a social committee which has many subcommittees. All board of directors are contributing voluntarily.

The social committee has three main goals which are commons between all Saudis Social Committees and they are as follow:
 Discover the needs of the citizens and alert them about them.
 Propose projects and programs necessary for the development of the local community and enhance the participation financially, morally and in human in the implementation, evaluation and follow-up of those projects and programs. 
 Contribute to the development of human resources for the community and the discovery of social leadership and investment to achieve sustainable development.

Dokhalah Festival
The Dokhalah is a pottery pot with some seedling planted in (such as barley), children take care of at the beginning of Pilgrimage Month. When Eid Al Adha day comes, children throw them toward the sea while chanting "Dokhlti Haji be..etc" it is well known in Sanabes in the eastern region of Saudi Arabia. Recently, an annual festival is held in Sanabes known as the "Dokhalah Festival" which also highlights the regional culture and heritage. The Dokhalah is known in Eastern Arabia as well.

To describe it, Dokhalah is the name of handmade flowerpot. It made of palm tree vanes and take a cylindrical shape. It is in small size and very handy to 3–5 years old child. It is filled with sand and implants with barley seeds. It kept to germinating and growing till barley get 5 to 10 centimeter in height, then it became ready as Dokhalah.

Nowadays, it is introduced in very nice look and implants with flowers in addition to barley. Each children him/her self is taking care of their Dokhalah and irrigate it on daily basis till grow and takes its final good shape as flowerpot. This practice initiates a good relation and connection between the children and their Dokhalah, so it became beloved to them.

How did Dokhalah origin? 
Dokhalah is an activity origin in Persian Gulf area since very long time ago. It became as the area’s custom and revive every year in tradition ceremony at Hajj Eid-Holiday. Dokhalah ceremonies started since more than 200 years ago by gathering the children in each neighborhood near the coast and start a special song for Dokhalah and at end they throw it to the sea water.

In the past, the pilgrims were travelling for long time in order to perform Hajj as no transportation means, and the parent forced to leave their children with their relatives for about 2–3 months. The Dokhalah began as pastime for the children to mitigate the impact of parent long travel to Hajj.

In Eid Al-Adha the pilgrims are doing one of the Hajj rituals which are called sacrifice by slaughter the goat (Qurban). The children were waiting their parents in very warm situation as this day is the sign of Hajj day toward the end and start back journey. So they are sharing their parents by doing another sacrifice which is throwing his very nice Dokhalah to sea water. Question may raise, why throwing it to the sea?, because it add value to the sea environment as fish eat the grass of Dokhalah.

The Dokhalah ceremony has nothing to do with the believes or any ritual religion, it is an expression about happiness of Eid Al-Adha’s advent and it is one of the most greatest holiday in Islam. Dokhalah event started during first day for Eid Al-Adha where Muslims performed their hajj at Makkah, so that, in the Dokhalah song each child solicit in.

Children are praying to Allah to give them opportunity to perform hajj when they became young and meet again with their parents, so that's the meaning of Dokhalah song. This is one way that their fathers taught them how to remember hajj and make objective to perform it as a major issue.

This practice was discontinued gradually due to life grown up and diminishing the down town life style. Also, the second generation has lost the interest to continue what they were gained from their old generation. In addition to that, the new generation did not attended celebration and nobody taught them about Dokhalah.

This tradition is also practiced in Kuwait and Bahrain. In Bahrain it is known as Hiyya Biyya. Research suggests that it very ancient, and may well predate the coming of Islam: see the reference by Holes below.

The first Dokhalah Festival 
In 2004, very few people from the middle and old generations were interested and eager to reactivate not only Dokhalah events but other heritage in the area that related to their grandfathers’ life which includes skills, building style, and old traditional games (entertainments). They started the idea of reactivate Dokhalah ceremony and they succeeded in announcing and gathering children at the coast and done exactly what was practiced in the past. This event really ringed the bill to majority of people about Dokhalah. This start helped people to start talking to their children about Dokhalah history and the wheel started again.

In 2005, the idea was more crystallized and the event took different shape than in 2004. The year 2006 is synchronized with the establishment of Sanabes Central Social Committee which is an official committee followed to Qatif headquarters committee. All reports to Ministry of Society Affairs. Working under the Sanabes committee umbrellas gave chance to work comfortably through authorized work structure and facilitate the all license difficulties.

Working through past three years revealed that people like their heritage and demonstrated massive interest to participate in of Dokhalah Festival. Questionnaire, made the year of 2006 reveal that 100% of attendance agreed to continue this ceremony. This is great success and excellent start and more challenge for coming year, especially, when people know that Sanabes village now is the only which is doing such traditional event and focus is more this year to make another success. In 2007, people expected that most of near-by neighborhoods will participate in attending the Dokhalah Festival.

Dokhalah Festival Goals 
The ultimate goals were achieved by having teamwork spirit and activate people skills and ability toward charity and social work. Other objectives from establishing such festival is to mitigate risk and road hazard of our citizen from travelling to very far distance during Eid holidays in order to get the entertainment for their families. Their place suffered from losing very young people (teenagers) during Eid Holidays where they subjected to vital road accidents. This festival if succeeded it will help in providing very near-by place where families not forced to cover long distance and rushing traffics and of course saving a lot of time.

References
Holes, C. ‘Arabian Gulf Hiyya Biyya, Jewish Babylonian farfisa, Christian Sicilian sepolcri: popular customs with a common origin?’ Journal of Semitic Studies 49/2 (2004), 275–287.

External links 
 "Dokhalah Festival"
 "Dokhalah official website"
 Alnoor Sports Club

Populated places in Eastern Province, Saudi Arabia